Phanocerus clavicornis is a species of riffle beetle in the family Elmidae. It is found in the Caribbean Sea, Central America, North America, and South America.

References

Further reading

 
 
 

Elmidae
Articles created by Qbugbot
Beetles described in 1882